This is a list of Malaysian football transfers for the 2017 second transfer window. Moves featuring Malaysia Super League, Malaysia Premier League and Malaysia FAM Cup club are listed.

The window opened on 15 May and closed on 11 June 2017.

2017 Second Transfers 
All clubs without a flag are Malaysian. Otherwise it will be stated.

Transfers

Loans

Unattached Players

Notes

References

2017
Tranfers
Malaysia